Petr Macháček (born October 19, 1985) is a Czech professional ice hockey defenceman currently playing for Piráti Chomutov in the Czech Extraliga.

References

External links

1985 births
Living people
BK Mladá Boleslav players
Piráti Chomutov players
Czech ice hockey defencemen
Motor České Budějovice players
Sportovní Klub Kadaň players
KooKoo players
HC Slovan Ústečtí Lvi players
HC Tábor players
SK Horácká Slavia Třebíč players
HC '05 Banská Bystrica players
Czech expatriate ice hockey players in Slovakia
Czech expatriate ice hockey players in Germany
Czech expatriate ice hockey players in Finland